The Saskatoon Rage were a Tier-II Junior "A" team based in Saskatoon, Saskatchewan, who played in the Saskatchewan Junior Hockey League.

Minot Americans 1987 - 1994
Minot Top Guns 1994- 1997
Beardy's Rage 1997 - 1998
Saskatoon Rage 1998 - 1999

History
The Rage originated in 1987 in the American city of Minot, North Dakota.  The team was never very successful, and was sold to interested parties at the Beardy's 97, Saskatchewan aboriginal reserve in 1997.  That arrangement lasted one season, as the team became the Saskatoon Rage in 1998 and played their home games at Harold Latrace Arena.  The team folded after one season in Saskatoon.

Season-by-season standings

Playoffs
1988 DNQ
1989 Lost Quarter-final
Notre Dame Hounds defeated Minot Americans 4-games-to-2
1990 DNQ
1991 DNQ
1992 DNQ
1993 DNQ
1994 DNQ
1995 DNQ
1996 DNQ
1997 Lost Preliminary
Estevan Bruins defeated Minot Top Guns 2-games-to-none
1998 DNQ
1999 DNQ

External links
Saskatchewan Junior Hockey League

Sport in Saskatoon
Defunct Saskatchewan Junior Hockey League teams
Defunct sports teams in Saskatchewan